William Tracy (died 1440) was the member of Parliament for the constituency of Gloucestershire for the parliament of 1419.

References 

Members of the Parliament of England for Gloucestershire
English MPs 1419
Year of birth unknown
1440 deaths